Ciro Menotti was one of four  built for the  (Royal Italian Navy) during the late 1920s. Completed in 1929, she played a minor role in the battle of Malaga during the Spanish Civil War of 1936–1939 supporting the Spanish Nationalists. Ciro Menotti carried out a number of resupply missions during World War II.

Design and description
The Bandiera class was an improved and enlarged version of the preceding s. They displaced  surfaced and  submerged. Their crew numbered 53 officers and enlisted men.

For surface running, the boats were powered by two  diesel engines, each driving one propeller shaft. When submerged each propeller was driven by a  electric motor. They could reach  on the surface and  underwater.

The boats were armed with eight  torpedo tubes, four each in the bow and stern for which they carried a total of 12 torpedoes. They were also armed with a single  deck gun forward of the conning tower for combat on the surface. Their anti-aircraft armament consisted of two  machine guns.

Construction and career
Ciro Menotti was laid down by Odero-Terni-Orlando at their Muggiano shipyard in 1928, launched on 29 December 1929 and completed later that year. The submarine bombarded roads and bridges around Málaga over the next several days in support of the Nationalist assault on the city.

After the entry of Italy in World War II, Ciro Menotti was used in resupply missions to North Africa and Albania until 1942, when she was assigned for training. Ciro Menotti was interned in Malta in September 1943 following the Cassabile Armistice, and finally scrapped on 1 February 1948.

Notes

References
 
 

Ships built in La Spezia
Ships built by OTO Melara
Bandiera-class submarines
World War II submarines of Italy
1929 ships